Timia apicalis is a species of ulidiid or picture-winged fly in the genus Timia of the family Ulidiidae. It is the Type species of the genus Timia.

References

Ulidiidae
Insects described in 1824
Taxa named by Christian Rudolph Wilhelm Wiedemann